Mhicaela Belen (born June 29, 2002) is a Filipino volleyball player. She is currently playing as an outside hitter for the NU Lady Bulldogs in the UAAP women's volleyball tournaments.

Volleyball career 
Belen is a member of NU Lady Bulldogs in the University Athletic Association of the Philippines. Belen made history as she became the first-ever Rookie of the Year and MVP in the UAAP Season 84. Her team NU Lady Bulldogs also won the title after 65 years.

Clubs 
 BaliPure Purest Water Defenders - (2018)
  Team Rebisco Philippines (2021 Asian Women's Club Volleyball Championship) - (2021)
  - (2022–present)

Awards

Individual

Collegiate

References 

Living people
2002 births
Filipino women's volleyball players
21st-century Filipino women
Outside hitters